Thomas Patrick Corrigan (17 February 1884 – 19 January 1952) was an Australian politician. He was an Australian Labor Party member of the Victorian Legislative Assembly from 1942 until his death in 1952, representing the seat of Port Melbourne.

Corrigan was born in South Melbourne, Victoria to Irish labourer Patrick Corrigan and his wife Mary Jane Edwards. He worked as a fitter and turner for the South Melbourne engineering firm Hillyards, and later with the Victorian Board of Works. He was a long-serving president and secretary of the local branch of the Amalgamated Engineering Union and secretary of the Port Melbourne branch of the Labor Party.

Corrigan was elected to the Legislative Assembly in 1942 when he won a by-election following the death of James Murphy. He would himself die in office in 1952, ten days after announcing his impending retirement due to ill health. He was buried at the Melbourne General Cemetery. His son, Stan Corrigan, won the resulting by-election to replace him in parliament.

References

1884 births
1952 deaths
Australian Labor Party members of the Parliament of Victoria
Members of the Victorian Legislative Assembly
Politicians from Melbourne
Australian people of Irish descent
20th-century Australian politicians
People from South Melbourne